Sanjeev Kapoor (born 10 April 1964) is an Indian celebrity chef, entrepreneur and television personality. Kapoor hosted the TV show Khana Khazana, the longest running show of its kind in Asia which was broadcast in 120 countries and in 2010 had more than 500 million viewers. He is also the first chef in the world to own a 24X7 food and lifestyle channel, Food Food which was launched in January 2011.

Early life and career
Kapoor was born in April 1964 in Ambala and spent his childhood in multiple North Indian cities. He began his career in the hospitality industry in 1984 after completing the Diploma in Hotel Management from the Institute of Hotel Management Catering & Nutrition, Pusa, New Delhi. Kapoor is married to Alyona Kapoor, who is also a part of his business, Turmeric Vision Pvt. Ltd. (TVPL).

After working in many hotels at different places like Varanasi, New Zealand, etc. he became the youngest Executive Chef of Centaur Hotel in Mumbai in the year 1992. He is also the recipient of the Best Executive Chef of India Award by H & FS and the Mercury Gold Award at Geneva, Switzerland by Indian Federation of Culinary Associations. He is on board as one of the key members of the International Culinary Panel of Singapore Airlines.

Awards 
 Padma Shri (2017)- fourth highest Indian national honour
 Achieved the Guinness World Record by cooking 918 kg khichdi live at World Food India 2017, New Delhi.
 Case Study on Sanjeev Kapoor Published By Harvard Association
 ITA Award (2015) - For Popular Chef & Entrepreneur (Zaika-E-Hind) 
 ITA Award (2010, 2004, 2002) - For Best Cookery Show ( Khana Khazana)
 National Award of ‘Best Chef of India’ by the Government of India for his popularity and contribution to Indian cuisine
 Ranked 31st in Reader's Digest list of ‘100 of India’s most trusted persons’ and 34th in the Forbes list of ‘top 100 Indian celebrities’.
 Panel of Judges for Master Chef India Season 3 and 4.

See also 

 Ranveer Brar
 Harpal Singh Sokhi
 Nisha Madhulika

References

External links

 
 
 

1964 births
Living people
Indian food writers
Indian chefs
Indian television chefs
Chefs of Indian cuisine
Recipients of the Padma Shri in other fields